Michael Thomas Gargiulo (born February 15, 1976) is a convicted American serial killer. He moved to Southern California in the 1990s and gained the nickname The Hollywood Ripper. He was convicted of two counts of first-degree murder and sentenced to death on July 16, 2021.

Crimes 
Gargiulo is a native of the Chicago suburb of Glenview, Illinois, where he may have stabbed his neighbor, 18-year-old Tricia Pacaccio, to death on her back doorstep. Her father found her body the next morning, on August 14, 1993. Gargiulo moved to Los Angeles in 1998, allegedly to escape the scrutiny of the police in Illinois, and committed two murders and attempted murder in Southern California between 2001 and 2008.

On February 21 2001 he murdered 22-year-old Ashley Ellerin, stabbing her 47 times in her home in Hollywood. Ellerin's injuries included a neck wound that nearly severed her head and deep punctures to the chest, stomach, and back. Some of her wounds were up to six inches deep. According to detective Tom Small, one stab wound "actually penetrated the skull and took out a chunk of skull like a puzzle piece." On the night she was murdered, Ellerin had planned a date including dinner and drinks with actor Ashton Kutcher.

On December 1, 2005, Gargiulo stabbed 32-year-old Maria Bruno, his neighbor, to death at her home in El Monte, California. She was stabbed 17 times. 

Gargiulo attempted to murder another neighbor, 26-year-old Michelle Murphy, in her home in Santa Monica on April 28, 2008. She fought off the attack, and blood matching Gargiulo's DNA was found at the scene.

Arrest and prosecution 
Gargiulo was arrested by the Santa Monica Police Department on June 6, 2008. On July 7, 2011, the Cook County State's Attorney charged Gargiulo with the first-degree murder of Tricia Pacaccio. Although Gargiulo was charged in the two California murders as well as the Pacaccio murder in Illinois, police did not link him to any other murders. Gargiulo allegedly told authorities in the Los Angeles County Jail that just because ten women were killed — and his DNA was present — does not mean he murdered anyone, leading investigators to believe that there are more victims. 

Media in Los Angeles dubbed Gargiulo the "Hollywood Ripper" and the "Chiller Killer." Gargiulo was held at Los Angeles County Jail while awaiting a capital murder trial. A pre-trial hearing was held on June 9, 2017, in Los Angeles Superior Court, with his trial scheduled to begin in October 2017. After delays, his trial began on May 2, 2019. In May 2019, actor Ashton Kutcher testified about the crimes. 

On August 15, 2019, Gargiulo was convicted on all counts. The penalty phase of his California trial started on October 7, 2019. He faced either a death sentence or life in prison without the possibility of parole. On October 18, 2019, a jury rendered a verdict of death for Michael Gargiulo after several hours of deliberation, but sentencing for Gargiulo in California continued to be delayed by defense motions. On July 16, 2021, Gargiulo was sentenced to death. Gargiulo is now expected to be extradited to Illinois for the 1993 killing of Tricia Pacaccio in his Illinois hometown. If extradited and convicted in Illinois, he will face a sentence of 25 years to life.

See also 
 Capital punishment in California
 List of death row inmates in the United States
 List of serial killers in the United States

References

Further reading 
 Richards, Tori (undated). "Michael Gargiulo: Alleged Hollywood Ripper". TruTv. Retrieved August 3, 2012.
 Murnick, Carolyn "The Hot One," Simon & Schuster Paperbacks

1976 births
21st-century American criminals
American male criminals
American people convicted of murder
American prisoners sentenced to death
American rapists
American serial killers
Criminals from Illinois
Criminals from Los Angeles
Living people
Male serial killers
People convicted of murder by California
People from Glenview, Illinois
Prisoners sentenced to death by California
Violence against women in the United States